Leaning on the Everlasting Arms is a hymn published in 1887 with music by Anthony J. Showalter and lyrics by Showalter and Elisha Hoffman.

Showalter said that he received letters from two of his former pupils saying that their wives had died.  When writing letters of consolation, Showalter was inspired by the phrase in the Book of Deuteronomy 33:27, "The eternal God is thy refuge, and underneath are the everlasting arms".

Lyrics 

Showalter wrote the lyrics to the refrain in Hartselle, Alabama and asked Hoffman to write the remaining lyrics.

What a fellowship, what a joy divine,
Leaning on the everlasting arms;
What a blessedness, what a peace is mine,
Leaning on the everlasting arms.

Refrain:

Leaning, leaning, safe and secure from all alarms;
Leaning, leaning, leaning on the everlasting arms.

O how sweet to walk, In this pilgrim way,
Leaning on the everlasting arms;
O how bright the path grows from day to day,
Leaning on the everlasting arms.

Refrain

What have I to dread, what have I to fear,
Leaning on the everlasting arms;
I have blessed peace with my Lord so near,
Leaning on the everlasting arms.

Refrain

Alternate version
There is an alternate version of the refrain, typically sung by basses:

Leaning on Jesus, leaning on Jesus, safe and secure from all alarms;
Leaning on Jesus, leaning on Jesus, leaning on the everlasting arms.

Versions
It has been performed and recorded by such artists as Roy Clark, Iris DeMent, Mahalia Jackson, George Jones, Twila Paris, Selah and Norbert Susemihl.

Alan Jackson included it in his 2006 live gospel album Precious Memories.

Playing for Change has a version with multiple musicians including Dr. John.

mewithoutyou uses the lyrics from the 3rd stanza and part of the 2nd in their song Watermelon Ascot from their Pale Horses album.

The Carter Family performed the hymn during their time on Mexican Radio Stations in the late 1930s and early 1940s. One version can be found on YouTube.

Brian Fallon included it in his 2021 studio album Night Divine.

In popular culture
The song has been used in several movies, including The Human Comedy (1943), “Native Son” (1950), The Night of the Hunter (1955), Phase IV (1974), Wild Bill (1995), Next of Kin (1989), True Grit (2010) (of which it forms about a quarter of the score) and First Reformed (2017).

In television, it was used in the Dollhouse season one episode "True Believer". It was also used in the House of Cards episode "Chapter 42" (season 4, episode 3), in the Law and Order: Special Victims Unit episode "Pattern Seventeen" (season 16, episode 9), in Justified (season 4, episode 5, "Kin") and in The Simpsons season 25, Episode 22 - "The Yellow Badge of Cowardge." It was also sung in the episode of The Andy Griffith Show "Mountain Wedding" during the wedding scene.

It was also used in a Guinness Beer commercial titled "Empty Chair" which was produced by Human Worldwide Inc. and in a 2014 Sainsbury's ad regarding the World War I "Christmas Truce" of 1914.

References

External links
Sheet music (PriMus and .png) in english and german language and midi score at steamboat-electric

American Christian hymns
1887 songs